This list is of the Historic Sites of Japan located within the Prefecture of Miyazaki.

National Historic Sites
As of 1 July 2019, twenty-three Sites have been designated as being of national significance (including one *Special Historic Site).

Prefectural Historic Sites
As of 1 May 2018, one hundred and nine Sites have been designated as being of prefectural importance.

Municipal Historic Sites
As of 1 May 2018, a further one hundred and nine Sites have been designated as being of municipal importance.

See also
 Cultural Properties of Japan
 History of Miyazaki Prefecture
 Hyūga Province
 List of Places of Scenic Beauty of Japan (Miyazaki)
 Miyazaki Prefectural Museum of Nature and History

References

External links
  Cultural Properties in Miyazaki Prefecture

Miyazaki Prefecture
 Miyazaki